The Commonwealth Association of Law Reform Agencies is an international association of permanent law reform agencies within Commonwealth nations that work on law reform. The organization hosts regular conferences which focus on developing reforms. The organization was formed in 2003 as part of Law Reform Agencies Day during the Commonwealth Law Conference.

Membership 
As of 2017, the website for the association reports the following membership organizations:
 Alberta Law Reform Institute, Canada
 British Columbia Law Institute, Canada
 England and Wales Law Commission
 Jersey Law Commission
 Lesotho Law Reform Commission
 Malawi Law Commission
 Manitoba Law Reform Commission, Canada
 Mauritius Law Reform Commission
 Namibia Law Reform and Development Commission
 New Zealand Law Commission
 Nigeria Law Reform Commission
 Scottish Law Commission
 South African Law Reform Commission
 Tanzania Law Reform Commission
 Trinidad and Tobago Law Reform Commission
 Uganda Law Reform Commission
 Vanuatu Law Commission
 Victorian Law Reform Commission, Australia

References 

Commonwealth of Nations
Law reform